Ana Maria Pérez (née Rodríguez) (born February 22, 1974 in Havana, Cuba) is a Cuban-American singer who has recorded under the stage names Ana and Mía.

Biography
Ana Maria Rodríguez was born in Havana, Cuba, on February 22, 1974. She relocated with her family to Miami, Florida in 1979. In 1984, Rodríguez signed to Parc Records when she was 10 years old. Under the name Ana, her self-titled debut album was released in 1987, and while it was not a hit in the U.S., it did achieve success in Japan, where it was titled Shy Boys. Ana's debut single "Shy Boys" peaked at No. 94 on the Billboard Hot 100 and No. 23 on the Billboard Dance Chart. With the help of producer Maurice Starr in 1990, she recorded her second album Body Language, which includes the duet "Angel of Love" with New Kids on the Block's Jordan Knight. Debbie Gibson also wrote two songs in the album: "Everytime We Say Goodbye" and "Friendly". The album's only single "Got to Tell Me Something" peaked at No. 66 on the Billboard Hot 100. Ana performed "Everytime We Say Goodbye" at the 19th Tokyo Music Festival that year.

After years of absence, Ana re-emerged under the name of Mía and released an all-Spanish language album entitled Tentación on Univision Records in September 2003. The album garnered her a Best New Artist of the Year nomination at the Premio Lo Nuestro 2004.

Discography

Albums
As Ana

As Mía

Singles
As Ana

As Mía

See also
 List of Cubans

References

External links
 
Ana
 
 

Mía
 
 

1974 births
Living people
21st-century American women singers
21st-century American singers
American dance musicians
American entertainers of Cuban descent
American freestyle musicians
American Latin pop singers
American women pop singers
American women singer-songwriters
Ballad musicians
Cuban emigrants to the United States
Cuban women singers
Dance-pop musicians
Hispanic and Latino American musicians
Hispanic and Latino American women singers
Musicians from Miami
People from Havana
Singer-songwriters from Florida
Spanish-language singers of the United States
Women in Latin music